Acomayo River (possibly from Quechua aqu sand, mayu river, "sand river")  is a river  in Peru located in the Huánuco Region, Huánuco Province, Chinchao District. It is a left tributary of the Huallaga River. The confluence is southeast of the town Acomayo, near the village Tingo Pampa.

See also
 Quiullacocha
 Wanakawri

References

Rivers of Peru
Rivers of Huánuco Region